Dognecea is a commune in Caraș-Severin County, in the Banat region of Romania, with a population of 2,009 people. It is composed of two villages, Calina (Kalina) and Dognecea.

References

Communes in Caraș-Severin County
Localities in Romanian Banat
Mining communities in Romania